This page is a list of Android-related topics.

A
Android –
Android Auto –
Android Debug Bridge –
Android Developer Lab –
Android Open Accessory Development Kit –
Android software development –
Android version history –
Android application package –
Android Things –
Android TV

B
Bionic

C
CyanogenMod –
ChromeOS

D
Dalvik virtual machine –
Developer Challenge –
Dev Phone –
Droid

F
Fastboot

G
Google Assistant –
Google Developers –
Google Duo –
Google Maps –
Google Nexus –
Google Pixel –
Google TV

K
Kindle OS

L
List of Android app stores –
List of Android games –
List of Android smartphones –
List of custom Android distributions –
List of free and open-source Android applications

O
OpenBinder –
Open Handset Alliance

P
Paranoid Android

R
Remix OS –
Replicant –
Renderscript –
Rooting

U
Ubuntu for Android

W
Wear OS

Android OS-related topics